Topal Recep Pasha ("Recep Pasha "Lame"; died 18 May 1632) was an Ottoman statesman from the Sanjak of Bosnia, as well as Damat ("bridegroom") to the House of Osman. He served as the Grand Vizier of the Ottoman Empire from 10 February 1632 to 18 May 1632. He was instrumental in lynching the former grand vizier, Hafız Ahmet Pasha. When his brother-in-law Sultan Murad IV realized this, he had Recep Pasha executed on 18 May 1632 in İstanbul.

References

17th-century Grand Viziers of the Ottoman Empire
17th-century executions by the Ottoman Empire
Bosnian Muslims from the Ottoman Empire
Year of birth unknown
1632 deaths